David Hendrix (born May 29, 1972) is a former player in the National Football League. He played for the San Diego Chargers. He played collegiality for the Georgia Tech football team. He is the father of Jajuan, David and Khenadi Hendrix.

Living people
1972 births
Players of American football from Georgia (U.S. state)
Georgia Tech Yellow Jackets football players
San Diego Chargers players
People from Jesup, Georgia